The 1996 Scheldeprijs was the 83rd edition of the Scheldeprijs cycle race and was held on 24 April 1996. The race was won by Frank Vandenbroucke of the Mapei team.

General classification

References

1996
1996 in road cycling
1996 in Belgian sport